Alexander Lindsay of Evelick may refer to:

 Sir Alexander Lindsay, 3rd Baronet (1683–1762), Scottish nobleman 
 Alexander Lindsay of Evelick (bishop) (c. 1561–1639), Scottish minister and bishop

See also 
 Alexander Lindsay (disambiguation)